Kim Rossi Stuart (born 31 October 1969) is an Italian actor and director.

Early life and career
Rossi Stuart was born in Rome. His father, Giacomo, was an actor of Italian and Scottish descent (his mother was Scottish). Kim's mother, Klara Müller, was a former top model of German and Dutch descent.

He began acting at the age of five. He studied theatre and in 1986 began acting regularly, especially on television productions such as the Fantaghirò series and for the cinema with a small role in The Name of the Rose. He reached popularity with Karate Warrior and in the film Poliziotti. After this commercial film, he began to act only in quality films, like Senza pelle, where his role, a man with psychological problems, was appreciated by critics. He then acted with director Antonioni in Al di là delle nuvole and played Julien Sorel in the French television film The Red and the Black (Le Rouge et le Noir) in 1997, based upon the novel of the same name by Stendhal.

Rossi Stuart came back to act in the theatre with Re Lear and with the most important Italian actors, like Turi Ferro in the work Il visitatore. In 2002, he appeared in the film Pinocchio as Lucignolo. In 2004, he played in Le Chiavi di Casa, as a young father that attempts to forge a relationship with his teenage, handicapped son when he met him for the first time.

Later, he played Mimmo in the television film Il tunnel della libertà (2004) and he had one of the leading roles (Freddo) in Michele Placido's 2005 film Romanzo Criminale, based on Giancarlo De Cataldo's 2002 novel of the same name.

Rossi Stuart wrote the screenplay, directed and acted in the 2006 film Anche libero va bene. It was followed by Piano, solo (2007), a film based on the life of Italian jazz musician Luca Flores, with Rossi Stuart playing Flores. Another film, Questione Di Cuore was released in 2009. Rossi Stuart's following film was Angel of Evil, based on the life of 1970s Italian gangster Renato Vallanzasca. It was released in Italy in January 2011 and opened in Germany in February of the same year.

Personal life
Rossi Stuart comes from a family of actors; his father Giacomo and his sister Valentina are both actors, the latter with credits as a stunt performer as well. He was named after the Rudyard Kipling novel Kim. He left his parents' home at age 14 and also left school to begin his career as an actor. Rossi Stuart was engaged to actress Veronica Logan. He speaks English, French and Italian, is an accomplished swimmer and also plays the trumpet. In 2005, Rossi Stuart suffered a severe road accident with multiple fractures and injuries.

In the September 2010 Italian issue of Vanity Fair, Kim spoke about his latest film and personal life, confirming that he is single and expressed the wish to become a father.

He has a son, born 26 November 2011 by his girlfriend Ilaria Spada. The couple married on 2 March 2019.

Filmography

Film

Television

References

External links

 

1969 births
20th-century Italian male actors
21st-century Italian male actors
David di Donatello winners
Italian film directors
Italian male film actors
Italian male stage actors
Italian male television actors
Italian people of Dutch descent
Italian people of German descent
Italian people of Scottish descent
Living people
Male actors from Rome
Nastro d'Argento winners
Ciak d'oro winners